Buniadpur railway station is a railway station of Buniadpur City belonging to Northeast Frontier Railway zone located in Dakshin Dinajpur district in the state of West Bengal, India. It serves Buniadpur City and the surrounding areas.

History

In 2004, when a broad-gauge railway track was being constructed from Eklakhi to Balurghat (Proposed to be extended up to Hilli), a radical change was seen in the transport system of Dakshin Dinajpur, as then State Highway 10 was the only way to connect other important locations.

The new Railway line gave an opportunity to the people of the Buniadpur to link to Kolkata by trains. The first train connected the station on 30 December 2004.

Trains
Buniadpur is an important railway station, next after Balurghat. It is the halt of 4 Express trains and terminal of a Passenger Train.

References

Railway stations in Dakshin Dinajpur district
Railway stations opened in 2004
Katihar railway division